The 2014 WNBL Finals was the postseason tournament of the WNBL's 2013–14 season. The Bendigo Spirit were the defending champions and they successfully defended their title by defeating the Townsville Fire.

Standings

Bracket
<onlyinclude>

Semi-finals

(1) Bendigo Spirit  vs. (2) Dandenong Rangers

(3) Townsville Fire vs. (4) Melbourne Boomers

Preliminary final

(2) Dandenong Rangers vs. (3) Townsville Fire

Grand Final

(1) Bendigo Spirit vs. (3) Townsville Fire

Rosters

References 

Finals
Women's National Basketball League Finals
2014 Finals